Lutogonia is a monotypic moth genus of the family Erebidae. Its only species, Lutogonia simplex, is found in Costa Rica. Both the genus and the species were first described by Schaus in 1913.

References

Calpinae
Monotypic moth genera